Shaun Ruwers (born 12 October 1982 in Durban) is a South African rugby union player for Stourbridge in National League 1. He joined London Wasps on an initial 4-month deal in September 2010.

He plays as a tighthead prop. He previously played for Worcester Warriors and at Waterloo.

References

External links
 Worcester Warriors profile

1982 births
Living people
Stourbridge R.F.C. players
Worcester Warriors players
Rugby union props
Rugby union players from Durban